Fiona Tan (born 1966 in Pekanbaru, Indonesia) is a visual artist primarily known for her photography, film and video art installations. With her own complex cultural background, Tan's work is known for its skillful craftsmanship and emotional intensity, which often explores the themes of identity, memory, and history.  Tan currently lives and works in Amsterdam, the Netherlands.

Early life and education
Fiona Tan was born in 1966 in Pekanbaru, Indonesia, to an Indonesian Chinese father and Australian mother. Tan spent her early childhood in Melbourne, Australia. In 1984 she moved to Europe, where she has resided since. Between 1988 and 1992 Tan studied at Gerrit Rietveld Academie in Amsterdam. Between 1996-1997 she also studied at the Rijksakademie van Beeldende Kunst.

Artistic practice
In 2019, Tan completed a photography/film project titled L'archive des ombres/Shadow Archive during her residency at the Mundaneum, a repository created by Belgian visionary Paul Otlet with the goal of cataloging all human knowledge. An exhibition of the same name was staged at the Musée des Arts Contemporains , Grand-Hornu, Belgium in 2019.

In 2009, she represented The Netherlands at the Venice Biennale with the solo presentation Disorient. She has also participated in Documenta 11, the Yokohama Triennale, the Berlin Biennale, São Paulo Biennial and also at the Istanbul Biennial, the Sydney Biennial and Asian Pacific Triennial. Her work is represented in many international public and private collections including the Tate Modern, London, Stedelijk Museum Amsterdam, Schaulager, Basel, the New Museum, New York, and the Centre Georges Pompidou, Paris.

She has been guest lecturer at many art institutions including professor at the postgraduate program De Ateliers, Amsterdam (2006–2014) and Kunsthochschule Kassel (2014–15).

In 2003 Tan created a poster, Lift, for Transport for London. In 2016 she directed her debut film, History's Future.[3] Her second feature film Ascent premiered at the 2016 Locarno International Film Festival. During this year she was also the artist in residence at the Getty Research Institute in Los Angeles, California.

Exhibitions
Over the past twenty years her work has gained increasing international recognition. Tan has had solo exhibitions in museums and galleries worldwide including the New Museum, New York, Vancouver Art Gallery, Sackler Galleries, Washington DC, Aargauer Kunsthaus, Switzerland, Akademie der Künsten, Berlin, Kunstverein Hamburg, Konsthal Lund, Landesgalerie Linz, Musée d'Art Contemporain, Montréal, Pinakothek der Moderne, Munich, and the Hammer Museum, Los Angeles.

Select solo exhibitions 
Inside Out, Montevideo/Time Based Arts, Amsterdam (1995)
2nd Johannesburg Biennale, Johannesburg (1997)
Roll I and II, De Pont Foundation for Contemporary Art, Tilburg, Netherlands (1999)
Elsewhere is a Negative Mirror, De Begane Grond, Utrecht, Netherlands (1999)
Cradle, Galerie Paul Andriesse, Amsterdam (1999)
Smoke Screen, De Balie, Amsterdam (1999)
Stimuli, Witte de With, Rotterdam (1999)
Venice Biennale, Venice (2001)
Rain, Galerie Elisabeth Kaufmann, Zurich (2001)
Documenta 11, Kassel, Germany (2002)
Link, Stedelijk Museum, Amsterdam (2003)
Istanbul Biennale, Istanbul (2003)
Time Zones, Tate Modern, London (2004)
Saint Sebastian, Musée d'Art Contemporain, Montréal, Canada (2005)
Saint Sebastian, Anna Schwartz Gallery, Melbourne, Australia (2005)
Countenance, Modern Art Oxford, Oxford, England, (2005)
Short Voyages, Frith Street Gallery, London (2006)
80 Tage, Vox Populi, Countenance; Pinakothek der Moderne, Munich (2007)
A Lapse of Memory, Royal Institute of British Architects, London (2007)
A Lapse of Memory, Frith Street Gallery, London (2007)
Countenance, Williams College Museum of Art, Williamstown, MA (2008)
Provenance, Rijksmuseum, Amsterdam (2008)
Disorient, Dutch Pavilion, 53rd Venice Biennale (2009)
Saint Sebastian, Arthur M. Sackler Gallery, Washington, DC (2009)
Rise and Fall, Freer Gallery of Art, Washington, DC (2010)
Vox Populi London, Frith Street Gallery, London (2010)
Rise and Fall, Aargauer Kunsthaus, Aarau, Switzerland
Rise and Fall, Vancouver Art Gallery, Vancouver, Canada (2010)
Vox Populi Switzerland, Centre Culturel Suisse, Paris (2011)
Rise and Fall, Wako Works of Art, Tokyo (2011)
Point of Departure, Centro Andaluz de Arte Contempraeneo, Sevilla, Spain (2012)
Disorient, Glasgow Gallery of Modern Art, Glasgow (2012)
Vox Populi London, The Photographers' Gallery, London (2012)
Ellipsis, 21st Century Museum of Contemporary Art, Kanazawa, Japan (2013)
Inventory, MAXXI, Rome (2013)
Inventory, Philadelphia Museum of Art, Philadelphia (2013-2014)
Terminology, Metropolitan Museum for Photography, Tokyo (2014)
Terminology, National Museum of Art, Osaka, Japan (2014)
Nellie, Wako Works of Art, Tokyo (2014)
Options & Futures, Rabo Kunstzone, Utrecht, Netherlands (2014)
Depot, Baltic Centre for Contemporary Art, Gateshead, UK (2015)
Ghost Dwellings, Frith Street Gallery Soho Square, London (2015)
Geography of Time, Nasjonalmuseet, Oslo (2015)
Inventory, Frith Street Gallery, London (2015)
Geography of Time, Nasjonalmuseet, Oslo (2015-2016)
Geography of Time, Mudam, Luxembourg (2016)
Ascent, Izu Photo Museum, Nagaizumi, Japan (2016)
Geografie of Time, Museum für Moderne Kunst, Frankfurt, Germany (2016-2017)
Disorient, Guggenheim Museum Bilbao, Abando, Spain (2016-2017)
Nellie, IMA, Brisbane, Australia (2017)
Geography of Time, Tel Aviv Museum of Art, Tel Aviv, Israel (2017)
Ascent, De Pont Museum, Tilburg, Netherlands (2017)
Time and Memory, Centro de Creación Contemporánea de Andalucía, Spain (2018)
Elsewhere, Frith Street Gallery, London (2018-2019)
Shadow Archive, MAC’s, Grand Hornu, Belgium (2019)
Ascent, Samstag Museum, Adelaide, Australia (2019)
Ideas of Utopia, Borch Editions Butik, Copenhagen (2019)
Disorient, Glasgow Gallery of Modern Art, Glasgow (2019-2020)
Goraiko, Sprengel Museum, Hannover, Germany (2019-2020)
Archive / Ruins, Peter Freeman, Inc., New York (2020)
Geography of time, Eye Film Museum, Amsterdam (2022)

Select group exhibitions
Cine y Casi Cone, Museo Nacional Centro de Arte Reina Sofia Museum, Madrid (2007)
Global Multitude, Rotunde, Luxemburg (2007)
L’oeil ecranou la nouvelle image, Casino Luxembourg (2007)
Museum of Contemporary Art of Bucharest, Romania (2007)
Contour, Museum Prinsenhof, Delf (2007)
Biennial of Moving Images, Geneva (2007)
Deutsche Börse Photography Prize, Photographer’s Gallery; Berlin (2007)
Neue Börse, Frankfurt (2007)
Breeze, cur. Marja Bloem, Gallery Nelson Freeman, Paris (2008)
The Tropics Martin- Gropius-Bau, Berlin (2008)
Be(com)ing Dutch, Van Abbemuseum, Eidenhoven (2008)
Rethink Kakotopia, Nikolaj, Copenhagen Contemporary Art Center (2009)
Self and Other, National Museum of Ethnology, Osaka (2009)
Architecture Biennale, Venice (2010)
São Paulo Biennial, São Paulo (2010)
Ich zweifellos, Kunstmuseum Wolfsburg, Wolfsburg (2010)
Moving Portraits, De La Warr Pavilion, UK (2011)
Expanded Cinema, MMOMA, Moscow (2011)
Architectural Environments for Tomorrow, MOT Tokyo (2011)
Le Pont, Musée d'Art Contemporain, Marseille
Beyond Imagination, Stedelijk Museum Amsterdam (2012)
Arte torna arte, Galleria dell'Accademia, Florence (2012)
Autobiography, Espace Culturel Louis Vuitton, Paris (2012)
Status, Fotomuseum Winterthur, Switzerland (2012)
Inseldasein, DAAD Galerie, Berlin (2013)
Suspended Histories, Museum van Loon, Amsterdam (2013)
Go-Betweens, Mori Art Museum, Tokyo, Japan (2014) 
Paradise Lost, CCA, Singapore (2014) 
FUTURE PRESENT, Schaulager, Laurenz Foundation, Basel, Switzerland (2015) 
NO MAN'S LAND, Rubell Family Collection, Miami, United States (2015) 
Ecce Homo, The National Museum of Art, Osaka, Japan (2016)

Select awards 
Fiona Tan received several international prizes and awards, including Getty Artist-in-Residence Fellowship, Los Angeles (2016); Deutsche Börse Photography Prize (nominee) (2007); ICP Infinity Award for Art, New York (2004); Artes Mundi Prize, Cardiff (nominee) (2003); and J.C. van Lanschot Prize for sculpture, Belgium/The Netherlands (1998).

Residencies 
Tan participated in established international residencies, including IASPIS grant and residency, Stockholm (2003) and DAAD scholarship and residency, Berlin (2001).

Further reading
 *

References

External links
 fionatan.nl
 Frith Street Gallery
 Fiona Tan  on Wako Works of Art
 Art Books about Fiona Tan
 Fiona Tan at De Pont Museum 
 Peter Freeman Inc., New York 
 Frith Street Gallery, London

20th-century sculptors
21st-century sculptors
Video artists
Conceptual artists
Women conceptual artists
1966 births
Living people
Indonesian artists
Indonesian Hokkien people
Indonesian people of Chinese descent
Indonesian women artists
20th-century women artists
21st-century women artists
Van Lanschot Kempen Kunstprijs winners